Didier Dogley is a Seychellois politician who served as the Minister of Tourism, Civil Aviation, Ports & Marine. from 27 April 2018 until 3 November 2020.

He was previously Minister of Environment, Energy and Climate Change.

References 

Living people
Seychellois politicians
Year of birth missing (living people) 
Aviation ministers of Seychelles
Energy ministers of Seychelles
Environment ministers of Seychelles
Marine ministers of Seychelles
Tourism ministers of Seychelles